(born Ishikawa Prefecture, 31 May 1971) is a former Japanese rugby union player who played as prop.

Career
Hailing from Ishikawa Prefecture, Hamabe was educated at Hakui Industrial High School. He played for Kintetsu Liners between the late 1990s and the early 2000s. Although he was in the 1995 Rugby World Cup Japan squad, he did not play in any of the tournament matches, his first cap for Japan was during the match against Canada, in Tokyo, on 9 June 1996. Although he did not take part in the 1999 Rugby World Cup, Hamabe was in the Japan national team until 2001, on 8 July, in Tokyo, during the match against Canada, the team against which he played his first international match.

Notes

External links
Kiyoshi Imaizumi international stats

}

1971 births
Living people
Hanazono Kintetsu Liners players
Japanese rugby union players
Rugby union props
Japan international rugby union players